Championship Surfer is an extreme sports video game developed by Krome Studios, published by Mattel Interactive in North American and GAME Studios in Europe, and released for Microsoft Windows, PlayStation and Dreamcast in 2000.

Development
Brisbane-based company Krome Studios led development of the title, and claimed to be "staffed with avid surfers, including current Australian national champion Mark "Richo" Richardson" who informed "development and implementation of wave dynamics, board dynamics, and the moves of the featured surfers in the game".

The game was originally announced in April 2000 as Billabong Pro Surfing, but would ultimately release with the endorsement of rival surfwear company O'Neill.

Gameplay
The title offers various modes including Arcade, Championship, Free Surf, Time Attack, King of the Waves and Rumble, and supports up to four players. The Championship mode uses scoring methods compliant with the Association of Surfing Professionals methodology. 

Players can select from one of eight real-life surfers including Cory Lopez, Shane Beschen, Jason Collins and Rochelle Ballard, with the game taking place on a fictional South Pacific Island with ten selectable beach locations, each with waves possessing their own unique breaking style and size, as well as varying weather conditions.

Reception

The Dreamcast and PlayStation versions received "mixed" reviews, while the PC version received "generally unfavorable reviews", according to the review aggregation website Metacritic. Daniel Erickson of NextGen said that the Dreamcast version was "Easily the best next-generation surfing game so far."

References

External links

2000 video games
Dreamcast games
Mattel video games
Multiplayer and single-player video games
PlayStation (console) games
Surfing video games
Video games developed in Australia
Windows games
Krome Studios games